Al-Hajj Nawab Ghulam Muhammad 'Abdu'l 'Ali Khan Bahadur (born 9 August 1951) is the current and eighth titular Prince of Arcot, holding this title since July 1993 after the death of his father, Ghulam Mohammed Abdul Khader. The family traces its origin back to the second Caliph Umar ibn al-Khattab.

He was Sheriff of Madras in 1984 and 1988.

He is married to Sayeeda Begum and has two sons, Nawabzada Mohammed Asif Ali and Nawabzada Mohammed Naser Ali.

See also
Nawab of the Carnatic

References

External links
, The Hindu, dated 1 February 2004

1951 births
Living people
Nawabs of India
20th-century Indian Muslims
Sheriffs of Madras